Ojo Caliente, is a spring in the Monticello Canyon in Socorro County, New Mexico.

References 

Springs of New Mexico
Bodies of water of Socorro County, New Mexico